Wonokromo Station is a railway station in Jagir, Wonokromo, Surabaya, East Java.

This station is the railway junction from Surabaya Gubeng station, Sidoarjo and to Madiun.

Services

Passenger services

Mixed class

Economy class

Lokal or Commuter
 Lokal Bojonegoro, destination of - and 

References

External links

Railway stations in Surabaya